Sophie Jane Raworth (born 15 May 1968) is an English journalist, newsreader and broadcaster working for the BBC. She is a senior newsreader and is one of the main presenters of BBC News (mainly BBC News at Six and BBC News at Ten). She has presented state occasions. She also presents the BBC's Election Night coverage alongside various other presenters.

In 2015, she became the new presenter of consumer affairs programme Watchdog and in 2016, began presenting Crimewatch, both for BBC One.

Early life
Sophie Jane Raworth was born on 15 May 1968 in Surrey to a florist mother and a businessman father. She grew up in Twickenham in Middlesex and attended the independent Putney High and St Paul's Girls' schools.

After completing a degree in French and German at the University of Manchester, Raworth spent a year teaching English to teenagers in Toulouse before studying for a postgraduate course in broadcasting and journalism at City, University of London.

Career
Raworth joined the BBC in 1992 as a news reporter, first for Greater Manchester Radio and then, in April 1994, as BBC Regions correspondent in Brussels. In May 1995, she became the regular joint presenter of BBC's Look North programme in Leeds.

Raworth moved to national television in 1997, to co-present the BBC's Breakfast News programme on BBC One, initially with Justin Webb, and in later years, with John Nicolson.

Raworth then joined the BBC's early morning news programme Breakfast at its launch in 2000, which she presented alongside Jeremy Bowen and in later years, Dermot Murnaghan, on Monday–Thursdays, and sometimes with regular relief presenters such as Bill Turnbull and Michael Peschardt. She then moved to the BBC Six O'Clock News in January 2003 which she presented alongside George Alagiah; she was a presenter on this bulletin until October 2005 when she went on maternity leave, and was replaced by Natasha Kaplinsky. In March 2006 Raworth was named as the main presenter of the BBC News at One, replacing Anna Ford on Monday-Thursdays. She took up the position in June 2006 after returning from maternity leave. She also can occasionally be seen presenting relief shifts on the rolling news channel BBC News Channel.

Raworth has presented several BBC specials, including coverage of the Queen's Golden Jubilee and Our Monarchy – the Next 50 Years, both alongside David Dimbleby. In addition, she has appeared on Tomorrow's World and, in the early 2000s, entertainment programmes such as Dream Lives and the quiz show Judgemental.

In 2004, Raworth appeared on the BBC fashion show What Not to Wear, in which she was given a makeover by style advisors Trinny Woodall and Susannah Constantine. In 2006 she was part of the television coverage of the Children's Party at the Palace, an event to celebrate the Queen's 80th birthday. Along with Huw Edwards, she presented some fake news updates for the programme, which led to many complaints from viewers. Raworth had a cameo role as a newsreader in the last series of the BBC comedy series My Hero.

At the end of the One O'Clock News on 31 January 2008, she announced that she would be leaving the programme until the summer, and confirmed Kate Silverton as presenting the bulletin during her absence. Raworth returned on 25 August 2008, after the birth of her third child, with the presentation of the Bank Holiday edition of the BBC News at One, BBC News at Six and BBC News at Ten. Raworth ran the Great North Run on 5 October 2008.

Since early 2009, Raworth has been the main relief presenter on the BBC News at Six and a regular relief presenter on the BBC News at Ten, often presenting when regular presenters Huw Edwards, Fiona Bruce and George Alagiah are not available. She has also appeared in place of Andrew Marr on The Andrew Marr Show, and presented on the BBC News Channel (formerly known as BBC News 24).

In May 2009, she presented The Trouble with Working Women with reporter and father-of-three Justin Rowlatt on the BBC. The programme looked at the role of the working woman. In 2009, she presented Crimewatch Roadshow on BBC One on weekday mornings.

In 2013, Raworth had a cameo appearance at the start of the film A Good Day to Die Hard as herself.

On 16 July 2013, Raworth was given an Award of Doctor of Arts honoris causa by City University London. Raworth presented Watchdog Daily in 2012 and Watchdog Test House in 2014 and 2015, before landing the role of main presenter on Watchdog in September 2015. She replaced Anne Robinson.

In February 2016, Raworth replaced Kirsty Young as main anchor of Crimewatch. She previously guest presented the programme in 2012.

In 2018, to celebrate the 100th anniversary of the Royal Air Force, Raworth presented a documentary called RAF 100: Into the Blue, where she talked about her grandfather, Captain Edwin Raworth, who was a pilot in the First World War.

On 3 December 2021, the BBC announced that Raworth will be the interim presenter on BBC One's Sunday Morning (currently The Andrew Marr Show) from 9 January 2022.

Personal life
Raworth married Richard Winter in 2003 and they live in London with their two daughters and one son.

In March 2017, the genealogy programme, Who Do You Think You Are? on BBC television, featured Raworth's family story. It revealed that she was descended from non-conformist ancestors who were members of the New Jerusalem Church. They lived in Birmingham at a time when the city was rocked by religious riots in 1791 with people like her ancestors being the targets. In the aftermath of the riots, Raworth's ancestors, William and Martha Mott, took a great risk by uprooting their young family to move to North America. However, within two years of arriving, the parents had died of yellow fever and the children were sent back to England. Raworth discovers in the programme that she was not descended from noted piano maker Henry Isaac Robert Mott as the family had believed, but from his cousin, Samuel Mott, who was sacked from the piano company and ended up taking his own life.

Investigating another branch of her paternal family tree, she found a long line of horticultural heritage stretching back to the 1700s, and beginning with her great-grandfather Edgar Cussons Crowder, who once worked in the Palm House at Kew Gardens. Further research reveals that her five-times great-grandfather, Abraham Crowder, grew and sold pineapple plants in the 18th century, at a time when the fruit was a prestigious luxury.

Running
On 17 April 2011, Raworth completed the London Marathon, despite collapsing two miles from the finish line. By 2017, she had completed all six World Marathon Majors.

In April 2018, Raworth completed the Marathon des Sables, a six-day,  ultramarathon in the Sahara Desert.

In October 2022, Raworth completed her 10th London Marathon.

Filmography
Film
A Good Day to Die Hard (2013) – Cameo, herself
Absolutely Fabulous: The Movie (2016) – Cameo, herself 
TV
Breakfast (2000–2002) – Presenter
BBC Nine O'Clock News (1999–2000) – Newscaster
BBC News at Six (2003–present) – Newscaster
BBC News at One (2006–present) – Newscaster
Crimewatch Roadshow (2009) – Presenter
Remembrance Sunday: The Cenotaph (2009–present) – Reporter
Watchdog Daily (2012) – Presenter
Doctor Who (2013) – Cameo, herself
Crimewatch (2012, 2016) – Guest presenter
The Andrew Marr Show (2013) – Guest presenter
Watchdog Test House (2014–2015) – Co-presenter
Chelsea Flower Show (2014–present) – Presenter
Watchdog (2015–2016) – Presenter
Bodyguard (2018) – Cameo, herself
The Funeral of HRH The Prince Philip, Duke of Edinburgh (2021) – Reporter
Sunday Morning (2022–present) – Presenter
Our Next Prime Minister (2022) – Presenter
The Proclamation of HM the King (2022) – Presenter
Scotland: The Vigil (2022) – Presenter
HM the Queen: The Journey to London (2022) – Presenter
HM the Queen: The Procession to Lying-in-State (2022) – Reporter

References

External links
 BBC News Profile of Sophie Raworth
 
 Sophie Raworth Profile TV Newsroom
 Raworth Steps in for Ford

1968 births
Alumni of City, University of London
Alumni of the University of Manchester
BBC newsreaders and journalists
English journalists
English television presenters
Living people
People educated at Putney High School
People educated at St Paul's Girls' School
People from Redhill, Surrey